Qingniandajie is an interchange station on lines 1 and 2 of the Shenyang Metro. The line 1 station opened on 27 September 2010, and the line 2 station opened on 30 December 2011.

Station Layout

References 

Railway stations in China opened in 2010
Shenyang Metro stations